The 2001 Royal Bank Cup is the 31st Junior "A" 2001 ice hockey National Championship for the Canadian Junior A Hockey League.

The Royal Bank Cup was competed for by the winners of the Doyle Cup, Anavet Cup, Dudley Hewitt Cup, the Fred Page Cup and a host city.

The tournament was hosted by the Flin Flon Bombers and Flin Flon, Manitoba.

The Playoffs

Round Robin

Results
Flin Flon Bombers defeat St. Jerome Panthers 6-2
Camrose Kodiaks defeat Thornhill Rattlers 4-1
Weyburn Red Wings defeat Flin Flon Bombers 6-2
St. Jerome Panthers defeat Thornhill Rattlers 5-4
Camrose Kodiaks defeat Weyburn Red Wings 4-3
Camrose Kodiaks defeat Flin Flon Bombers 5-1
Weyburn Red Wings defeat St. Jerome Panthers 8-1
Flin Flon Bombers defeat Thornhill Rattlers 5-2
Camrose Kodiaks defeat St. Jerome Panthers 4-3
Weyburn Red Wings defeat Thornhill Rattlers 5-3

Semi and Finals

Awards
Most Valuable Player: Darrell Stoddard (Camrose Kodiaks)
Top Scorer: Darrell Stoddard (Camrose Kodiaks)
Most Sportsmanlike Player: Mark Debusschere (Flin Flon Bombers)
Top Goalie: Scott Galenza (Camrose Kodiaks)
Top Forward: Jason Vermeulen (Weyburn Red Wings)
Top Defenceman: James Laux (Weyburn Red Wings)

Roll of League Champions
AJHL: Camrose Kodiaks
BCHL: Victoria Salsa
CJHL: Cornwall Colts
MJHL: OCN Blizzard
MJAHL: Antigonish Bulldogs
NOJHL: Rayside-Balfour Sabrecats
OPJHL: Thornhill Rattlers
QJAAAHL: St. Jerome Panthers
SJHL: Weyburn Red Wings

See also
Canadian Junior A Hockey League
Royal Bank Cup
Anavet Cup
Doyle Cup
Dudley Hewitt Cup
Fred Page Cup

External links
Royal Bank Cup Website

Canadian Junior Hockey League national championships
Royal Bank Cup 2001
Sport in Flin Flon
Royal Bank Cup 2001